William MacDonald (January 7, 1917 – December 25, 2007) was President of Emmaus Bible College, teacher, Plymouth Brethren theologian and a prolific author of over 84 published books.

Biography

Early life and education
William (Bill) MacDonald was born on January 7, 1917, in Leominster, Massachusetts. 
In 1922, in the Western Hebrides, William was dying of diphtheria.  A mucous membrane was forming across his throat, and breathing was becoming increasingly difficult.  His Christian mother turned her back so she would not see William take his last breath.  At that very moment, there was a knock at the door.  It was her brother-in-law from an adjoining village.  He said, "I've just come to tell you that you don't have to worry about William.  He is going to recover, and one day God is going to save his soul." Mom was distracted and incredulous:  "Whatever makes you say that?".  Then he explained he had been sitting at his fire reading Psalm 91 when God distinctly spoke to him through the last three verses.

When he was six years old, his family moved to Stornoway, Scotland, and later moved back to Massachusetts. He received a Bachelor of Arts degree from Tufts College in 1938 and an MBA from Harvard Business School in 1940.

Career
After graduation, he was employed as an investment analyst at the First National Bank of Boston (now known as BankBoston) until 1942. During 1942, MacDonald enlisted in the Navy, where he served until 1946. He then served on the faculty of Emmaus Bible School until 1965, becoming President in 1959. He contributed to the Emmaus Correspondence School through his writings.

President of Emmaus Bible College (1959-1965)
While President of Emmaus Bible College, MacDonald made lasting contributions.  Among his accomplishments are numbered:
 Leading Emmaus Bible College to purchase of the 156 N. Oak Park facility
 Leading the merging of the Toronto and Chicago schools in Oak Park
 Leading the purchase of the Groveland building in 1960
 Bringing the "Emmaus student enrollment above 100 in the resident school and above 60 in the evening school."

Post-Presidency Career
After 1965, he led a Bible-teaching ministry in the USA, Europe, and Asia until 1972. In 1973 he served on the faculty of the Discipleship Intern Training Program, based in San Leandro, California, until 1996. After 1996, MacDonald moved back to the Bible-teaching ministry, until his death on December 25, 2007.

Works
 The Good News Bible Correspondence Course (The Moody Bible Institute, 1954)
 Hebrews: From Shadow to Substance (The Moody Bible Institute, 1957)
 Believer's Bible Commentary (1989)
 True Discipleship (1975)
 The Epistle to the Hebrews: From Ritual to Reality
 1 Peter: Faith Tested, Future Triumphant; A Commentary
 Ephesians: The Mystery of the Church; A Commentary
 Worlds Apart (Gospel Folio Press, 1993)
 The Wonders of God (Gospel Folio Press, 1996)
 Once in Christ: In Christ Forever (Gospel Folio Press, 1997)
 Our God Is Wonderful (Gospel Folio Press, 1999)
 Be Holy: The Forgotten Command (John Ritchie Publications, 1999)
 Here's the Difference: Bringing Important Biblical Distinctions Into Focus (Gospel Folio Press, 1999)
 Joseph Makes Me Think of Jesus (Gospel Folio Press, 2000)
 Living Above the Average (Gospel Folio Press, 2001)
 Now THAT is Amazing Grace (Gospel Folio Press, 2001)
 God Still Speaks (Gospel Folio Press, 2002)
 True Discipleship (Gospel Folio Press)
 The Disciple's Manual (Gospel Folio Press)
 One Day at a Time (Gospel Folio Press)
 My Heart, My Life, My All'' (Gospel Folio Press)

References

External links
 
 In Memory of William MacDonald
 Free MP3 Sermons of William MacDonald on www.voicesforchrist.org (Page 1/2)
 Free MP3 Sermons of William MacDonald on www.voicesforchrist.org (Page 2/2)
 Gospel Folio Press publishes and sells books by author, William MacDonald
 Remembering Bill MacDonald from Emmaus College , page 3

1917 births
2007 deaths
Christian writers
Harvard Business School alumni
Tufts University alumni
American Plymouth Brethren
American evangelicals